Mark Rolston (born December 7, 1956) is an American character actor, known for his supporting roles in popular films such as Aliens, Lethal Weapon 2, The Shawshank Redemption, The Departed and the Saw film series, as well as Gordie Liman in The Shield (2003).

Career

Rolston played PFC M. Drake in Aliens (1986), Hans in Lethal Weapon 2 (1989), Stef in RoboCop 2 (1990), Bogs Diamond in The Shawshank Redemption (1994), J. Scar in Eraser (1996), Chief Dennis Wilson in Daylight (1996), Wayne Bryce in Hard Rain (1998) and Special Agent Warren Russ in Rush Hour (1998). 

Rolston acted in Martin Scorsese's 2006 film The Departed and the television horror film Backwoods. Many of Rolston's screen roles are villains due to his well-known icy stare. He also co-starred in 2008's Saw V and 2009's Saw VI. In 1994, he portrayed convicted killer "Karl Mueller" in the Babylon 5 episode "The Quality of Mercy", as well as "Richard Odin", leader of a vegetarian cult in an episode of The X-Files titled "Red Museum". He was also originally considered to voice the supervillain Firefly in Batman: The Animated Series in 1992, although the character was deemed unsuitable for the series and ultimately dropped. 

Rolston later voiced Firefly in The New Batman Adventures and Justice League. In 2004, Rolston would guest star in two episodes of the critically acclaimed 24. He appeared in a minor role in The CW series Supernatural during the fourth season as the demon Alastair. He also appeared as Sheriff Hall in the Criminal Minds episode, "Blood Hungry".

He had voice acting roles in the video games Blade Runner and Turok and Halo 4. He voiced Deathstroke in Batman: Arkham Origins in 2013 and in Batman: Arkham Knight in 2015, as well as Norman Osborn in Spider-Man in 2018 and in a mid-credits scene of its standalone follow-up, Spider-Man: Miles Morales in 2020.

He has a recurring role as Lex Luthor in the animated series Young Justice; his Shawshank Redemption co-star Clancy Brown also played Luthor for various animated TV shows over the course of his career.

Personal life
Rolston was born in Baltimore, Maryland, the son of Evelyn Beverly (née Sturm) and Thomas George Rolston, who was a computer programmer.

Filmography

Film

Television

Video games

References

External links

1956 births
American male film actors
American male television actors
American male video game actors
American male voice actors
Living people
Male actors from Baltimore
20th-century American male actors
21st-century American male actors